Tatiana de la tierra (May 14, 1961 – July 31, 2012) was a Colombian writer, poet and activist. She was the author of the first international Latina lesbian magazine Esto no tiene nombre.

Early life
Tatiana de la tierra was born in Villavicencio, Colombia on May 14, 1961. She emigrated to the US in 1969 at the age of eight. Her family settled in Homestead, Florida. At her elementary school, de la tierra volunteered to help in the school library. 

De la tierra stated she reportedly knew she was attracted to women around the time she reached the age of 10 or 11, but did not come out as a lesbian until 1982.

Career
De la tierra attended Miami-Dade Community College and received her associate degree in 1981. There, she worked as a library assistant. She later attended the University of Florida, where she earned her bachelor's degree in psychology in 1984. In the 1990s, de la tierra began editing and publishing Esto no tiene nombre, which later became known as Conmoción.

Esto no tiene nombre

Esto no tiene nombre was a quarterly Latina lesbian magazine that  published the work of renowned Latina writers: including Cherríe Moraga, Achy Obejas, Carmelita Tropicana, Laura Aguilar, Marcia Ochoa, Juana María Rodríguez and Luz María Umpierre. Much of de la tierra's early work was self-published and distributed by hand, including at the Encuentros de Lesbianas Feministas de América Latina y del Caribe ("Gatherings of Lesbian Feminists of Latin America and the Caribbean").

Esto no tiene nombre began as a magazine without a title and de la Tierra tried to get its readers involved in naming the magazine, eventually settling on the current name. Its title is said to be a symbol of rejection towards the heteronormative label and image of Latina lesbians. De la tierra published an article in the journal Aztlán that detailed the internal politics and editorial conflicts surrounding the publication of these magazines, and points of debate connected to the 'sex wars' of the era. The magazine's contents and call for activism were inspired by the feminist work of Kitchen Table: Women of Color Press, and publications such as This Bridge Called My Back.

Later career
After a while, Esto no tiene nombre and Conmoción ceased publication due to a lack of funding.  1999, she earned her Master's of Fine Arts in creative writing from the University of Texas at El Paso De la tierra also earned a Master's of Library Science from the University at Buffalo in 2000. Shortly after earning her second master's degree, she began her Jean Blackwell Hutson Library Residency at the University at Buffalo's undergraduate library. Two years later, she was hired by that same library as an information literacy librarian. Later, she moved to California, where she became the director of Hispanic Services at Inglewood Public Library.

Later life and death
Kidney disease led to de la tierra stepping away from her writing, leaving a memoir unfinished. 

De la tierra passed away on July 31, 2012, some time after being diagnosed with stage 4 cancer. Her papers and unpublished materials were donated to the University of California, Los Angeles.

Reception 
De la tierra's work endured criticism from conservatives due to the nature of her writings. De la tierra did not hold back when it came to eroticism, with some of her work even compared to pornography. She was shameless about discussing sexuality and this encouraged others to speak freely about sexuality, sex, and the human body.

Sandra K. Soto notes that de la tierra's work challenges heteronormative views. De la tierra' became an activist through her work and felt a need to challenge the stereotypes surrounding lesbianism and what it means to be a woman or a woman of color. She also wrote explicitly about fatness as a feminist issue. She wanted schools to incorporate LGBTQ issues and material into their curriculum; more specifically, she hoped this would happen in all English composition classes from elementary to high school to prevent homophobia and educate students on the concept of identity.

Selected bibliography 
The Hickey (1972)
Esto no tiene nombre 
Conmoción
La telaraña
For the Hard Ones: A Lesbian Phenomenology/ Para las duras: Una fenomenología lesbica (2002, Calaca Press) 
Porcupine Love and Other Tales from my Papaya Buffalo: Chibcha Press, 2005. 
Píntame Una Mujer Peligrosa Buffalo, N.Y.: Chibcha, 2005. 
tierra 2010: poems, songs & a little blood Long Beach, Calif: Chibcha Press, 2010. 
Xía y las mil sirenas (2009, Editorial Patlatonalli) (children's book)

Notes

External links

 Official site

1961 births
2012 deaths
American lesbian writers
American women poets
American LGBT poets
University of Texas at El Paso alumni
University at Buffalo alumni
University of Florida alumni
People from Villavicencio
Lesbian poets
Hispanic and Latino American writers
Colombian lesbian writers
Colombian LGBT poets
LGBT Hispanic and Latino American people
American magazine founders
21st-century American women writers
21st-century American poets
Women activists